The political systems of Imperial China can be divided into a state administrative body, provincial administrations, and a system for official selection. The three notable tendencies in the history of Chinese politics includes, the convergence of unity, the capital priority of absolute monarchy, and the standardization of official selection. Moreover, there were early supervisory systems that were originated by local factions, as well as other political systems worthy of mention.

Fundamental System: Autocratic Monarchy

Principles and Foundation 
During the Warring States period, the ancient Chinese text Han Feizi proposed the establishment of the first all-encompassing autocratic monarchy for the future of the state. During the same time period, Shang Yang from the state of Qin would enact political reforms into practice. The imperial system would eventually be constituted by the time of the establishment of the Qin, which would introduce the system of Three Lords and Nine Ministers, which would also foster the system of prefectures and counties. Units of measurements, currency, and writing would be standardized and books and scholars of the previous regime were burned and buried; vital to ideological integrity. Officials were then to act as faculties of the law from this point forward.

Consolidation and reinforcement 

In resolute action to settle domestic concerns, Western Han conducted conclusive capital punishments, issued the Decree of Mercy and the Law of Supplementary Benefits,  denounced the Hundred Schools of Thought, and only extolled Confucianism. By instituting the system of three provinces and six ministries, the feudal bureaucracy completed and achieved a rigorous system that diminished the prime minister's power and reinforced imperial power. Complementary to this governing body, establishment and improvement of the Imperial Civil Examination enhanced the availability of invigorated government officials which in turn provided a recurrent administration. Regulation of military power requisitioned the removal of total military authority from senior generals and local commanders. This, in turn, permitted sanctioning of three government officials to command the imperial army of which were mediated internally via privy council. Within the framework of organized executive power; the administration, the military, the financial powers of the chief ministers, the privy Councillors, and the three Secretaries partitioned and absorbed the authorities of the prime minister, respectively. Regulation of financial power was acquired by arranging consignments on appropriate levels of operations to coordinate local finances. Finally, standardization of judicial powers was executed via dispatching of civil officials to serve as local judiciaries. These means and measures concentrated the sovereignty of the head of state; surmounting military, administrative, financial, and judicial authority from all levels of governance, this subsequently vanquished the foundation of feudal-vassal separation..

Further development and final shape
In the central government, the executive system of central officials was improved during Yuan dynasty. It established the Xuanzheng Yuan (the Bureau of Buddhist and Tibetan Affairs) to direct religious affairs and to govern the region of Tibet. At the local level, the provincial system was practiced. At the beginning of the Ming dynasty, the prime minister was abolished, and the power was divided into six departments. The local government implemented the division of power among the three functioning departments. The Qing dynasty followed the system of the Ming dynasty, set up more military offices, put up literary prisons, thus strengthened the centralisation of authoritarianism.

Central political systems

Three Lords and Nine Ministers system 

The three lords and nine ministers system was a central administrative system adopted in ancient China that was officially instituted in Qin dynasty and later developed in Han dynasty.

Three Lords referred to three highest rank officials in the imperial government, namely:
 the Chancellor
 the Imperial Secretary
 the Grand Commandant

Nine Ministers comprised all the ministers of importance in the central government. They were:

 the Minister of Ceremonies
 the Supervisor of Attendants
 the Commandant of Guards
 the Minister of Coachmen
 the Commandant of Justice
 the Grand Herald
 the Director of the Imperial Clan
 the Grand Minister of Agriculture
 the Small Treasurer

Three departments and six ministries system 

The three lords and nine ministers system was replaced by the system of three provinces and six ministries by Emperor Wen of the Sui dynasty. The three departments were Shangshu, Zhongshu and Menxia. The central committee was responsible for drafting and issuing imperial edicts; Subordinate provinces shall be responsible for the examination and verification of administrative decrees; Shangshu was responsible for carrying out important state decrees, and the heads of the three provinces were all prime ministers. The six ministries were officials, households, rites, soldiers, punishments, and workers. The three provinces and six ministries had both divisions of labor and cooperation, and they supervised and contained each other, thus forming a strict and complete system of the feudal bureaucracy, effectively improving administrative efficiency and strengthening the ruling power of the central government. The separation of the three powers weakens the power of the prime minister and strengthens the imperial power. The officially adopted systems of Song, Yuan, Ming, and Qing dynasties all changed a little on this basis.

Prime minister system 

Qin established the system of three lords and nine ministers in the central government. Emperor Wu of the Western Han dynasty reformed the official system implemented the internal and external dynasties system and weakened the power of the prime minister. Emperor Guangwu of the Eastern Han dynasty expanded the power of the Shangshu department. Sui and Tang dynasties established the system of three provinces and six departments, dividing the power of the prime minister into three and containing each other, which reflected the strengthening of the imperial power. In the northern song dynasty, under the chancellors, the chief ministers were appointed as deputy ministers to divide the administrative power of the chancellors. There were privy secretaries to divide the military power and three divisions to divide the financial power. The Yuan dynasty set up a Zhongshu province, with prime ministers on the right and left, exercising the functions and powers of prime ministers. The Ming dynasty abolished the prime minister and divided the power into six parts. Emperor Yongle set up a cabinet and implemented "draft vote." The military offices were set up in the Qing dynasty, and the remnants of the prime minister system disappeared, reflecting that the imperial power had reached its peak. From the changes, we can see that the emperor divided and weakened the power of the prime minister, gradually concentrated all kinds of power in his own hands, and thus effectively implemented the autocratic monarchy. Notable prime ministers include Prime Minister Zhu of Shu, Prime Minister Xiao of Western Han and Prime Minister Wang of Song.

Local political systems

Enfeoffment system 
To consolidate the power of slave owners, the rulers of the Western Zhou dynasty implemented the system of enfeoff vassals politically, which enabled the Zhou dynasty to consolidate its rule and expand its territory. In the spring and autumn period, it gradually collapsed and was replaced by the system of prefectures and counties, which remained in some later dynasties.

Prefecture and county system 
During the Spring and Autumn period and the Warring States period, the Qin dynasty was carried out nationwide, thus replacing the feudal system nationwide, greatly weakening the independence of local authorities and strengthening the centralization of power. This was an epoch-making reform in China's local administrative system. The prefecture and county system was used for a long time in ancient China, with a very far-reaching influence.

Province system 
At the beginning of the Western Han dynasty, the system of prefectures and counties was implemented in local areas, and at the same time, the system of enfeoffment was established. Counties and countries were parallel to each other, which was not conducive to the unified management of the country, with the risk of division. The Yuan dynasty was a feudal country with a vast territory at that time. Its establishment consolidated the unification of the country and ensured the centralization of power in the system. The provincial system of the Yuan dynasty had a far-reaching influence on the political system of later generations. Since then, the provincial system has become the local administrative organ of China, which was followed in the Ming and Qing dynasties and has been retained until today.

Monk system 
In the Ming dynasty, Tibet practiced the system of monks and officials. Because the Tibetan people believed in Tibetan Buddhism, the Ming government used religion to rule the Tibetan people which was later called the 'monk system'.

Eight banners system 

The eight banners system was in the late Ming dynasty when Nuzhen rulers Nurhaci to create a system of eight banners system according to the military organization form the Jurchen establishment, controlled by the aristocrat, with military conquering three functions, administrative management, organize production, is a soldier and unity of social organization, is a military organization and administrative management system, promote the development of the Nuzhen society. The eight banners army played an important role in unifying China in the Qing dynasty. However, with the invasion of western capitalism , the corruption of the eight banners army itself and the gradual decline of its combat effectiveness, the Hunan army and Huai army, which rose up in the process of suppressing the Taiping Heavenly Kingdom, had a great impact on it.

Bureaucratisation of Local Officers 
During the reign of the Ming dynasty, in successive congruity with the Yuan dynasty, installed and enforced a provincial system in the southwest region, where residential officials received sponsorship from the central government. These residential officials, held by local factions, exercised their administration within their jurisdiction until the fall of the Great Ming.

Official selection system

Evolution of Official Selection 

The standard of Official Selection by familial history gradually developed to emphasize talent instead. This method would eventually progress to form the standard of public examinations, to which this mechanism of cultivating talent would be institutionalized, making examinations a notoriously rigorous process to accomplish.

Imperial supervision systems

Qin dynasty 
The central government set up the imperial historian, whereas the local government set up the imperial supervisor.

Western Han dynasty 
Emperor Wudi of the Han dynasty set 13 prefectures as the supervision area, and set the provincial history department for supervision.

Eastern Han dynasty 
The supervision power of the provincial governor was further strengthened, and the local administrative power and military power were gradually increased. At the end of the Eastern Han dynasty, the provincial governor evolved into the local highest military and political officer.

Northern Song dynasty 
There was a general court to supervise the prefectures, which could report directly to the emperor.

Ming dynasty 
The local government set up the department of criminal investigation to administer local supervision and justice. In addition, the factory also set up a spying agency to monitor officials and civilians at all levels.

Political systems created by local factions 
Uniform land system, rent modulation, government military system, Fan-Han divide and rule system, fierce peace and restraint, provincial system, and the eight flag system are critical systems created by local factions of noteworthy historical mention.

Other critical political systems in ancient China

Eclectical system 
During the closing era of archaic society, the selective appointment of affiliated alliance leaders was conducted within the circle of noble families. This was not only reflective of antiquating public participation in politics, but also a sign of archaic society's vestiges.

Hereditary system 
A hereditary system with its distinctive privatization embodied the significant progress of society.

Patriarchal systems  
Since the Western Zhou dynasty, the patriarchal clan system was a system in which the inheritance relationship and the title were determined by blood relationship and marital status. The patriarchal clan system and privilege system formed by the patriarchal system had a far-reaching influence on later generations.

Gentry system 
The gentry was developed from influential landlords and belonged to the most prestigious stratum of the landlord class. The gentry system was formed during the Wei and Jin dynastic era. This system selected officials in accordance to the level of their familial backgrounds, though it was often notably plagued by corruption.

References

See also 
 History of China